The Turkish School of Army Aviation (Kara Havacılık Okulu) based at Isparta, is one of the schools of the Turkish Army and is responsible for the training and development of the Turkish Army Aviation Command personnel and equipment. It was founded in 1948 under the name of artillery excavation within the artillery school. In 1957, it was removed from the artillery school and took the name of aviation. Kara Aviation School continued its educational activities until 2019 at its campus next to the command building in Güvercinlik in Ankara. After the new air base project of the Turkish Army, it was decided to move to Isparta. The training of military aviators within the Turkish Army Aviation Command in Ankara continues at the school campus located in Isparta. The school campus is next to Süleyman Demirel Airport.

See also
 Turkish Army Aviation Command
 Turkish Air Force
 Turkish Army
 Army aviation

References

External links 
  Official website of the Turkish Army Aviation School (Turkish)
 Army Aviation Command

School of Army Aviation
Air units and formations of Turkey
Aviation schools in Turkey
Army aviation units and formations of Turkey
Military education and training in Turkey